Rumah Pilkada is the Indonesian flagship news program which broadcast on Kompas TV. This program is about Elections in Indonesia in various regions that held 2018 local elections.  and now 2020 local elections.

History 
Through the program Rumah Pilkada (English: House Of Pilkada), Kompas TV will presented a number of events for the community to get to know all the candidates for regional heads who will fight in the elections. Of course through this 'Rumah Pilkada' Kompas TV wants to make the momentum of the elections as a good, honest and fair democratic process like in a house, So the term house is taken to give context that we are in one house so that it is demanded by honesty, so we can compete but must be managed with the concept of kinship.

References

External links 

Indonesian-language television shows
Indonesian television shows
2010s Indonesian television series
2018 establishments in Indonesia
Kompas TV

Kompas TV original programming